Hanak is a town in Ardahan Province of Turkey, on the road from Ardahan to Posof. It is the seat of Çıldır District. Its population is 2,880 (2021).

See also 
 Hanák
 Hanakia

References

Populated places in Ardahan Province
Towns in Turkey
Hanak District